Ghatsa santhamparaiensis also known as the Santhampara loach is a species of ray-finned fish in the genus Ghatsa.

References

Fish described in 2002